The Pontiac Trans Sport is a minivan marketed by the Pontiac division of General Motors over two generations for model years 1990-1999 along with GM badge engineered variants, the Chevrolet Lumina APV and Oldsmobile Silhouette.  

Introduced a year before the second-generation Chrysler minivans, the Pontiac Trans Sport and its counterparts marked an industry shift in the minivan segment towards adopting the form factor used by Chrysler. The APV vans shared mechanical commonality with the W platform sedans, along with a unique front-wheel drive, transverse-engine chassis. 

The Trans Sport was assembled at North Tarrytown Assembly (Tarrytown/Sleepy Hollow, New York), shifting production to Doraville Assembly (Doraville, Georgia) for its second generation.  For the 1998 model year, Pontiac renamed the Trans Sport the Pontiac Montana, after an exterior trim package introduced in 1997.

Background
The Trans Sport and its siblings were created by General Motors to compete with the Chrysler minivans and followed the Chevrolet Astro and GMC Safari, which had used a body-on-frame, rear wheel drive truck platform. Chevrolet and Oldsmobile badge engineered variants of the U-body minivans, with the Lumina APV and Silhouette. In accordance with those brands' images, the Trans Sport was targeted at sport- and style-oriented buyers, while the Lumina and Silhouette targeted the value and premium markets respectively.

Concept

A Trans Sport concept car was first presented in 1986, featuring futuristic styling, rear gull-wing doors, a built-in Nintendo Entertainment System, and a glass roof. This concept was well-received, and a production Trans Sport was approved in 1987. Most of the concept's more salient features were not translated to the production model, such as the gull-wing doors and glass roof. Chevrolet and Oldsmobile would receive badge engineered variants of the U-body minivans, with the Lumina APV and Silhouette respectively.

Technology

The Trans Sport, along with the Lumina APV and Silhouette, rode on the U-body platform and was constructed from a galvanized steel space frame, featuring dent and rust resistant polymer plastic body panels on the side and a galvanized steel roof. Similar construction was employed on the Pontiac Fiero, as well as some GM Saturn vehicles.

The Trans Sport had three seating options: five-seat (three removable bucket seats in the second row); seven-seat (adding two removable bucket seats in a third row) and six-seat configuration, with two bucket seats per row. Air suspension was offered as an option.

The 1994 Trans Sport featured the first powered sliding side door in a production vehicle; this was initially intended to debut in 1993, but was pushed back due to technological difficulties. The Trans Sport also added a driver's-side airbag in 1994.

For model years 1994 and 1995, traction control was optional with the 3800 engine, and became standard in 1996 with the 3.4-liter V6.

Reception

A focal point of the U-body minivans was their styling. GM's approach, ostensibly to create a sport-styled van, was derided; the vans were called "dustbusters" colloquially, after the pointy-nosed handheld vacuum cleaner of the same name. Moreover, the unusually long and steeply sloped windshield, and resultant long distance to the windshield's base from the driver's position, made the vehicles disconcerting to drive for some. Following slow sales and pointed criticism in Chrysler advertisements, the Trans Sport and Lumina APV were facelifted in 1994. The nose was shortened by 3 inches, some cladding was removed, and the interior dashboard received a ridge to lessen the perceived distance to the windshield's base. The European market did not receive this facelift, as the vans' initial styling had not been negatively received there. For model years 1994 and after, the European Trans Sport became an Oldsmobile Silhouette (which had not been facelifted in the U.S. market bar a minor facelift to the front bumper in 1993) with Pontiac badging.

At launch, the Trans Sport's 3.1-liter V6 was received as underpowered for the relatively large vehicle. This was rectified in the 1992 model year, with a 3.8-litre V6 offering improved torque and acceleration becoming optional. In 1995, a 1.9-liter turbodiesel by PSA became an option in the European market.

First generation (1990-1996)

1990
All new model.
Available as Trans Sport (with silver cladding) and Trans Sport SE (monochromatic), both offered the 120-hp 3.1L V6 and three-speed automatic.
Launched in Europe with minor differences in exterior trim required for regulatory concerns as well as engine and transmissions appropriate for Europe's differing fuel cost and vehicle taxation structure. In some European countries sold through Opel dealers.

1991
Customer complaints regarding glare reflected on the interior of the windshield from the massive expanse of the dashboard led to the addition of black carpeting in lieu of the more reflective plastic used in the previous year.
Power windows and door locks made standard on American models.
A manual sunroof was newly available.

1992
Base model was discontinued and a sporty GT model was added. 
Newly available for 1992 was GM's 3800 V6 engine coupled with a Hydra-Matic 4T60 4-speed electronically controlled automatic transmission. It was standard on the GT, optional for SE.
With the departure of the base model, silver cladding was no longer available.
Leather seating became available as an option on the GT model. Previously, leather seating was an Oldsmobile Silhouette exclusive within the U-body minivans.
The cowl-mounted fixed radio antenna mast was eliminated, and an integrated roof antenna was installed, sandwiched between the roof and the headliner.
Side view mirrors were changed to the folding type and were enlarged to provide better rear-ward visibility.
Brakes were enlarged and anti-lock brakes (ABS) was added as standard equipment.
Steering wheel-mounted controls for the stereo system were added as an option on SE and standard on GT.

1993
Due to very slow sales in 1992, the Trans Sport GT was dropped after one year. Trans Sport SE continues; it would be the only trim level available from 1993 to 1996. The SE model could be outfitted with any of the GT's options.
The text badges were changed from black to the van's colours.
A remote controlled power sliding side door was announced for 1993, but failed to actually make it into production that year due to quality control problems.
A new color scheme with gold cladding, gold wheels and a body-colored roof behind the C-pillar was available as an extra-cost option with certain exterior colors.
A redesigned center console was added this year with revamped, larger climate controls, a large storage cubby and a large storage bin at its base.

1994

The exterior styling was revamped, three inches (76 mm)  were trimmed off the nose. Headlights taken from the Pontiac Bonneville were installed with Bumper-mounted fog lamps added as standard equipment and cladding was made less flamboyant and stylized.
In an effort to lessen the perceived distance to the base of the windshield, a ridge was added to the interior dash finishing panel.
The power sliding door became available as an option, after being announced in 1993 but delayed due to quality control problems.
Built-in child seats for the second row became available as an option.
A traction control system became available as an option with the 3.8L V6.
Rear deep-tinted windows now featured a darker tint than previously used.
A driver's side airbag became standard equipment.

1995
Automatic power door locks that engaged/disengaged with the transmission shifting into or out of "park" added as a standard feature of the power door lock option package.
Rear portion of the roof, behind the C-pillar previously painted black as standard with body color as a no-cost option, would be only available painted body color as a further effort to "normalize" the vehicles' looks as compared to competitors.

1996
Both 3.1 and 3.8 L V6 engines dropped, a 3.4 L V6 3400 engine became the only power plant available.
There were few other changes, due to a completely redesigned 1997 model, to debut in summer 1996.

European market

The European-market version of the van from 1990 to 1993 had amber rear turn signals, and four small oblong headlamps. For 1992 a new composite headlamp assembly was used. The front turn signals used amber lenses, and side turn signal repeaters are installed. The headlamp washers from 1990 to 1993 were four smaller dome-shaped jets positioned in front of each low and high beams.

When North American Pontiac Trans Sport received a mid-cycle refresh with new front design in 1994, the low sales volume did not justify expense of recertifying the new front design and headlamps. Thus, the Oldsmobile Silhouette was rebadged as Pontiac Trans Sport and was sold in Europe until 1996. The headlight washers were redesigned to two single wedge sticks.

Pontiac Trans Sport for the European market had two engine and two transmission options: 3.8L V6 engine with 4T60 4-speed automatic transmission and 2.3L four-cylinder Quad 4 (LD2) engine and 5-speed manual transmission (never offered in the North American version).

Second generation (1997-1999)

1997–1999
In the 1997 model year, the Trans Sport and its siblings got their first major redesign, ditching the one-of-a-kind construction and look to create a more conservative, conventional minivan. Gone were spaceframes, plastic body panels, and sleek styling. The new minivans were of unibody steel construction and the styling was intentionally conventional to such an extent that contemporary reviewers remarked that without looking closely at the badging and grille treatments, these minivans could be mistaken for their primary competitors, the Dodge Caravan and Plymouth Voyager, which at the time commanded a 50% share of the minivan market.

During the development of this generation of the U-body minivan, General Motors extensively benchmarked the then current Chrysler minivans. The resultant vehicles more closely resembled the immensely successful trio; However, Chrysler would launch a completely redesigned minivan line a year before GM.

The last model year for the Trans Sport was 1998 in the U.S. and 1999 in Canada.  The Doraville, Georgia assembly plant that produced the Trans Sport closed on September 26, 2008.

Safety criticism

A crash test video of the 1997 Trans Sport/Montana conducted by the Insurance Institute for Highway Safety (IIHS) resulted in some criticism due to extreme damage to the vehicle in the  moderate overlap crash test. The minivan received a "Poor" rating and was ranked the "Worst Performing Vehicle" by the institute as a result.

Some comments made by the IIHS after the first test in 1996 were:
 Major collapse of the occupant compartment left little survival space for the driver.
 Extreme steering wheel movement snapped the dummy's head backward.
 The unnatural position of the dummy's left foot indicates that an occupant's left leg would have been seriously injured in a real-world crash of this severity.
 The forces on the left lower leg were so high that the dummy's metal foot broke off at the ankle.

The safety issues of the Trans Sport/Montana were later addressed with the Montana SV6, which earned the highest rating of "Good" given by the institute in the moderate overlap crash test.

The National Highway Traffic Safety Administration gave the van 4 stars for driver protection and 3 stars for passenger protection in the  frontal impact test. In the side impact test, it received 5 stars for front passenger protection, and 5 stars rear passenger protection.

European market
This version of the Pontiac Trans Sport was also sold in Europe as a Chevrolet, alongside the Opel/Vauxhall Sintra; however, unlike the Sintra, which was based on the Pontiac Trans Sport, Pontiac Montana, Chevrolet Venture, Oldsmobile Silhouette and the previous generation Buick GL8, but wore the European Opel or British Vauxhall badges and trim, the Chevrolet Trans Sport (as it was known) was trimmed and badged exactly like the Pontiac Trans Sport, the only differences being where Chevrolet badges were used in place of the Pontiac badges. In all cases, the European-market vans used different front, side and rear lighting equipment, different seat belts and sundry other safety items, to comply with ECE regulations which differ from US safety standards. These models were discontinued between 2003 and 2005, depending on the market. Despite limited sales in most of Europe, the vehicle was particularly successful in Sweden - where it was the best selling minivan for a while. While production ended in 2005, European stock lasted until 2007.

1997–2004

For the 1997 and 1998 model year (1999 in Canada), along with the roll out of this new generation of minivans, the Pontiac (Trans Sport) Montana was debuted, which had special cladding and wheels intended to give it a more rugged SUV-like appearance. In the 1999 model year (2000 in Canada), the name "Trans Sport" was dropped due to the popularity of the "Montana" appearance package. By the time the "Trans Sport" moniker was dropped, the "Montana" package accounted for over 80% of total Trans Sport sales. 

Engine:
 1997–1998 3.4 L (207 CID) LA1 3400 V6

See also
Oldsmobile Silhouette
Chevrolet Lumina APV

References

External links

Front-wheel-drive vehicles
Minivans
Trans Sport
Trans Sport
1990s cars
Cars introduced in 1989
Motor vehicles manufactured in the United States
Cars discontinued in 1999